Richard Dawes may refer to:
 Richard Dawes (classical scholar) (1708–1766), English classical scholar
 Richard Dawes (educationalist) (1793–1867), English cleric and educationalist
 Richard Jeffries Dawes (1897–1983), Canadian World War I flying ace